Kanding is a light rail station of the Danhai light rail, which is operated by New Taipei Metro. It is the northwestern terminus of the line, and is located in Tamsui District, New Taipei, Taiwan.

Kanding Station is the northernmost railway station in Taiwan.

Station overview
The station is an at-grade station with an island platform. It is located at Shalun Road Section 2 near its intersection with Xinshi 6th Road Section 2.

Station layout

Around the station

 Danhai Light Rail Depot
 Miranew Danhai

References

2018 establishments in Taiwan
Railway stations opened in 2018
Danhai light rail stations